The Town of Lac du Flambeau is located in Vilas County, Wisconsin, United States. The population was 3,004 at the 2000 census. The land base of the Lac du Flambeau Band of Lake Superior Chippewa is located within the town and also consists of a large portion of the town. The Lac du Flambeau census-designated place is located within the town. The unincorporated community of Marlands is also located in the town. Lac du Flambeau, situated around Flambeau Lake, is a year-round vacation destination.

Demographics

At the 2000 census there were 3,004 people, 1,093 households, and 821 families in the town. The population density was 29.9 people per square mile (11.6/km).  There were 2,981 housing units at an average density of 29.7 per square mile (11.5/km).  The racial makeup of the town was 39.55% White, 0.20% Black or African American, 59.39% Native American, 0.30% from other races, and 0.57% from two or more races. 1.60% of the population were Hispanic or Latino of any race.
Of the 1,093 households 31.7% had children under the age of 18 living with them, 49.2% were married couples living together, 19.3% had a female householder with no husband present, and 24.8% were non-families. 20.1% of households were one person and 8.1% were one person aged 65 or older. The average household size was 2.72 and the average family size was 3.07.

The age distribution was 29.8% under the age of 18, 7.1% from 18 to 24, 23.0% from 25 to 44, 23.4% from 45 to 64, and 16.8% 65 or older. The median age was 37 years. For every 100 females, there were 99.1 males. For every 100 females age 18 and over, there were 90.6 males.

The median household income was $30,349 and the median family income  was $33,036. Males had a median income of $27,589 versus $22,560 for females. The per capita income for the town was $15,176. About 12.1% of families and 15.7% of the population were below the poverty line, including 24.1% of those under age 18 and 5.0% of those age 65 or over.

Economy
The Lac du Flambeau Band have developed the Lake of the Torches resort and casino.
The Lac du Flambeau Band started the LDF Business Development Program.

Notable people

 Stosh Boyle, businessman and Mayor of the City of Cibolo, TX
 Ellsworth K. Gaulke, businessman, educator, and politician
 Justus Smith Stearns, businessman and Michigan Secretary of State
 William R. Yeschek, businessman and politician

References

External links
Lac du Flambeau Chamber of Commerce
Lac du Flambeau Public School
 With a Land Dispute Deadlocked, a Wisconsin Tribe Blockades Streets - New York Times article about a property dispute between the Town of Lac du Flambeau and the Lac du Flambeau Band of Lake Superior Chippewa

Towns in Vilas County, Wisconsin
Towns in Wisconsin